Aphrophantis is a genus of moths of the family Crambidae. It contains only one species, Aphrophantis velifera, which is found on Fiji.

References

Crambinae
Taxa named by Edward Meyrick
Monotypic moth genera
Moths of Fiji
Crambidae genera